J. gracilis may refer to:
 Jaegeria gracilis, a flowering plant species
 Jungia gracilis, a plant species of the genus Jungia
 Juniperus gracilis, a plant species in the genus Juniperus

See also
 Gracilis (disambiguation)